Mesityl bromide is an organic compound with the formula (CH3)3C6H2Br. It is a derivative of mesitylene (1,3,5-trimethylbenzene) with one ring H replaced by Br. The compound is a colorless oil. It is a standard electron-rich aryl halide substrate for cross coupling reactions. With magnesium it reacts to give the Grignard reagent, which is used in the preparation of tetramesityldiiron.

It is prepared by the direct reaction of bromine with mesitylene:
(CH3)3C6H3 + Br2 → (CH3)3C6H2Br + HBr

References

Bromoarenes
Phenyl compounds